Paul-Henry Chombart de Lauwe (4 August 1913, Cambrai – 11 January 1998, Antony), was a noted French urban sociologist. He was strongly influenced by the Chicago school and was an early advocate of participatory planning.

Biography
In the 1930s, Paul-Henry Chombart de Lauwe studied sculpture and philosophy at the École des Beaux-Arts, where he also became interested in ethnology and sociology. After graduating in philosophy, he first worked in Cameroun, but in 1937 returned to France to absolve the compulsory military service. After the defeat of the French army in 1940, he first fled to North Africa but returned to France after the armistice, where he cooperated with the Resistance. In 1942 he fled again via Spain to North Africa, and joined the Allied air force as a fighter pilot.

The postwar housing shortage raised Chombart de Lauwe's interest in urban sociology. In 1950 he established the Groupe d'ethnologie sociale to study the social history of Paris. Based on this research, he proposed significant changes to the planning of Paris, including public access to the city's monuments, avoiding the segregation of residential and industrial land uses - a mantra of modernist urban planning at the time, and public engagement in urban renewal projects.

Publications 
La découverte aérienne du monde, Horizon de France, Paris, 1948
 Paris et l'agglomération parisienne, Presses universitaires de France, Paris, 1952
Des hommes et des villes, 1965
Pour une sociologie des aspirations, 1969
La Culture et le pouvoir, 1975
La Fin des villes : mythe ou réalité ?, 1982

References

Urban sociologists
French sociologists
1913 births
1998 deaths
French male writers
20th-century French male writers